Ophiura is a genus of echinoderms belonging to the family Ophiuridae.

The genus has cosmopolitan distribution.

Species:

Ophiura acervata 
Ophiura achatae 
Ophiura aequalis 
Ophiura albata 
Ophiura albida 
Ophiura amphitrites 
Ophiura annulata 
Ophiura anoidea 
Ophiura astonensis 
Ophiura atacta 
Ophiura bartonensis 
Ophiura bathybia 
Ophiura bognoriensis 
Ophiura bridgerensis 
Ophiura caledonica 
Ophiura calyptolepis 
Ophiura carnea 
Ophiura carpelloides 
Ophiura clemens 
Ophiura costata 
Ophiura crassa 
Ophiura cretacea 
Ophiura cryptolepis 
Ophiura ctenophora 
Ophiura cunliffei 
Ophiura davisi 
Ophiura elongata 
Ophiura estarensis 
Ophiura falcifera 
Ophiura fallax 
Ophiura figurata
Ophiura flagellata 
Ophiura flexibilis 
Ophiura floscellata 
Ophiura fluctuans 
Ophiura fraterna 
Ophiura furiae 
Ophiura gagara 
Ophiura graysonensis 
Ophiura grubei 
Ophiura hendleri 
Ophiura imbecillis 
Ophiura imprudens 
Ophiura indica 
Ophiura innoxia 
Ophiura integra
Ophiura kofoidi 
Ophiura koreni 
Ophiura kunradeca 
Ophiura kurilensis 
Ophiura lanceolata 
Ophiura lenticularis 
Ophiura leptoctenia 
Ophiura lienosa 
Ophiura ljungmani 
Ophiura luetkenii 
Ophiura lutkeni 
Ophiura maculata 
Ophiura marylandica 
Ophiura micracantha 
Ophiura migrans
Ophiura mimaria 
Ophiura minuta 
Ophiura mitescens 
Ophiura monostoecha 
Ophiura mundata 
Ophiura nana 
Ophiura neglecta 
Ophiura nitida 
Ophiura olifex 
Ophiura ooplax 
Ophiura ophiura 
Ophiura palliata 
Ophiura parviformis 
Ophiura paucilepis 
Ophiura paucisquama 
Ophiura platyacantha 
Ophiura podica 
Ophiura prisca 
Ophiura pteracantha 
Ophiura quadrispina 
Ophiura robusta 
Ophiura rondeletii 
Ophiura rouchi 
Ophiura sarsii 
Ophiura saurura 
Ophiura scutellata 
Ophiura scutulata 
Ophiura spinicantha 
Ophiura squamosa 
Ophiura stellata 
Ophiura stenobrachia 
Ophiura sternbergica 
Ophiura straini 
Ophiura tenera 
Ophiura tenorii 
Ophiura texana 
Ophiura tinurtiensis 
Ophiura travisana 
Ophiura trimeni 
Ophiura umitakamaruae 
Ophiura undulata 
Ophiura utahensis 
Ophiura ventrocarinata 
Ophiura verrucosa 
Ophiura vindobonensis 
Ophiura violainae 
Ophiura wetherelli 
Ophiura zebra

References

Ophiuridae
Ophiuroidea genera